Jolbert Alexis Cabrera Ramírez (born December 8, 1972) is a Colombian former baseball player. Previously, he played in Major League Baseball for the Cleveland Indians (1998–2002), Los Angeles Dodgers (2002–2003), Seattle Mariners (2004), and Cincinnati Reds (2008). Cabrera hits and throws right-handed. He is the older brother of former shortstop Orlando Cabrera. The two played together during the 1997 season while members of the Ottawa Lynx, the Montreal Expos Triple-A affiliate.

Cabrera made his major league debut with the Indians on April 12, 1998, in the only game he played that season. 2001 was Cabrera's best statistical season in Cleveland, as he slashed a line of .261/3/38 with ten stolen bases for the division-winning Indians.  A highlight of that 2001 season was in a nationally-televised Sunday Night Baseball game on August 5, when Cleveland rallied from a 14-2 deficit in the seventh inning to win 15-14 on Cabrera's broken-bat, walk-off single off Jose Paniagua. Cabrera was traded on July 22, 2002 to the Los Angeles Dodgers for minor league pitcher Lance Caraccioli. He remained there until an early season trade in 2004 sent him to Seattle. He was released in 2005. During the 2007 offseason, Cabrera signed a minor league contract with the St. Louis Cardinals that included an invitation to spring training. After spending most of the year with their Triple-A affiliate, the Memphis Redbirds, Cabrera was released and signed a minor league contract with Colorado Rockies. On January 5, 2008, Cabrera signed a minor league contract with the Cincinnati Reds and was called up to the majors on June 10. On September 7, 2008, Cabrera hit a walk-off single against the Cubs to win the game 4–3. On January 12, 2009, he signed a minor league contract with an invitation to spring training with the Baltimore Orioles. On January 15, 2010, it was reported that Cabrera had signed a minor league deal with the New York Mets with an invitation to spring training.

In an eight-year career, Cabrera had a batting average of .257 with 18 home runs and 157 RBI in 609 games.

In 2017, Cabrera was a coach for Colombia in the World Baseball Classic, and in the 2023 WBC, he served as the team's manager.

Cabrera currently resides in Scottsdale, AZ.

References

External links
, or Baseball Almanac, or Retrosheet
Pelota Binaria (Venezuelan Winter League)

1972 births
Living people
Águilas del Zulia players
Albany Polecats players
Algodoneros de Guasave players
Buffalo Bisons (minor league) players
Burlington Bees players
Cardenales de Lara players
Cincinnati Reds players
Cleveland Indians players
Colombian expatriate baseball players in Canada
Colombian expatriate baseball players in Mexico
Colombian expatriate baseball players in the United States
Colorado Springs Sky Sox players
Dayton Dragons players
Expatriate baseball players in Japan
Fukuoka SoftBank Hawks players
Guerreros de Oaxaca players
Harrisburg Senators players
Las Vegas 51s players
Los Angeles Dodgers players
Louisville Bats players
Major League Baseball infielders
Major League Baseball outfielders
Major League Baseball players from Colombia
Memphis Redbirds players
Mexican League baseball infielders
Minor league baseball managers
Norfolk Tides players
Ottawa Lynx players
Palm Beach Cardinals players
Sportspeople from Cartagena, Colombia
Pericos de Puebla players
Piratas de Campeche players
San Bernardino Spirit players
Seattle Mariners players
Sumter Flyers players
Tigres del Licey players
Colombian expatriate baseball players in the Dominican Republic
Venados de Mazatlán players
West Palm Beach Expos players
Colombian expatriate baseball players in Venezuela
Colombian expatriate sportspeople in Japan